

Belgium
 Belgian Congo – Eugène Henry, Governor-General of the Belgian Congo (1916–1921)

France
 French Somaliland –
 Victor Marie Fillon, Governor of French Somaliland (1916–1918)
 Jules Gérard Auguste Lauret, Governor of French Somaliland (1918–1924)
 Guinea – Jean Louis Georges Poiret, Lieutenant-Governor of Guinea (1915–1919)

Japan
 Karafuto – Masaya Akira, Governor-General of Karafuto (13 October 1916 – 17 April 1919)
 Korea – Hasegawa Yoshimichi, Governor-General of Korea (1916–1919)

Portugal
 Angola –
 Jaime Alberto de Castro Morais, Governor-General of Angola (1917–1918)
 Filomeno da Câmara Melo Cabral, Governor-General of Angola (1918–1919)

United Kingdom
 Malta Colony – Paul Methuen, Governor of Malta (1915–1919)
 Northern Rhodesia – Sir Lawrence Aubrey Wallace, Administrator of Northern Rhodesia (1911–1921)

Colonial governors
Colonial governors
1918